Île-d'Aix is a commune and an island in the Charente-Maritime department, region of Nouvelle-Aquitaine (before 2015: Poitou-Charentes), off the west coast of France. It occupies the territory of the small Isle of Aix (île d'Aix), in the Atlantic Ocean. It is a popular place for tourist day-trips during the summer months.

Location

Île-d'Aix is located at the mouth of the river Charente, between Oléron Island and the coast of mainland France. The island is also close to Fort Boyard.

History

During the Roman period, it seems the island was connected to the continent at low tide. It finally took its current shape around 1500.

In 1067, Isembert de Châtelaillon gave the island to the order of Cluny. A small convent was established, which depended on St Martin in Île de Ré.

At the end of the 12th century, France and England fought for the possession of the island. Until 1286, the island was located at the boundary between the French and the English Saintonge, formed by the estuary of the river Charente. During the [[Hundred Years< War]], the island became English for about 15 years.

In the 16th century, during the French Wars of Religion, the island became Catholic and then Protestant.

In 1665, nearby Rochefort was established as a strategic harbour for the Kingdom, leading to the construction of many fortifications in the area. Vauban built numerous fortifications on the island, which Ferry completed in 1704.

During the Seven Years' War (1756–1763), the British captured the island in 1757 and destroyed its ramparts as part of the attempted Raid on Rochefort, before withdrawing several weeks later. The island was again captured by British forces in 1759 following the Battle of Quiberon Bay and occupied until the end of the war in 1763. The fortifications were then rebuilt by several French officers, including Pierre Choderlos de Laclos, the author of Les Liaisons dangereuses.

During the French Revolution, in 1794, the island was used as a prison for the suppression of religious opponents in which hundreds of priests were left to die in moored prison-boats. About 226 were buried in the sands of Île-d'Aix.

Napoleonic period

Napoleon famously visited the island in 1808 and gave directions to reinforce the fortifications. He ordered the construction of a house for the commander of the stronghold (today's Musée Napoléon) and the construction of Fort Liedot, named after a colonel killed in the Russian campaign.

In 1809, the Battle of the Basque Roads (French: Bataille de l'Île d'Aix) was a naval battle off the island of Aix between the British Navy and the Atlantic Fleet of the French Navy. On the night of 11 April 1809, Captain Thomas Cochrane led a British fireship attack against a powerful squadron of French ships anchored in the Basque Roads. In the attack, all but two of the French ships were driven ashore. The subsequent engagement lasted three days but failed to destroy the French fleet.

From 12 to 15 July 1815, Napoleon also spent his last days in France at Île d'Aix, after the defeat at Waterloo, in an attempt to slip past a Royal Navy blockade and escape to North America. Realising the impossibility of accomplishing his plan, he wrote a letter to the British regent and finally surrendered to HMS Bellerophon, which took him to Torbay and Plymouth before he was transferred to Saint Helena.

Population

It has a population of 223 as of 2008.

Sights
Located on the island is the large Fort Liédot, which functioned as a military prison from the early 19th century to the 1960s. The Algerian independentist and future President Ben Bella was imprisoned there from 1956 to 1962, together with other National Liberation Front militants such as Mohamed Khider and Hocine Aït Ahmed.

Transport

Access to the island is provided by a year-round ferry, which leaves several times a day from Fouras, just east of the island, or from La Rochelle, and Oléron, during the summer months. Cars (except for service vehicles) are prohibited on the island, which allows more tranquility. People move around on foot or by bicycle. Horse carriages are also available to travel on the island.

See also
Communes of the Charente-Maritime department

References

 Tony Jaques Dictionary of Battles and Sieges: A Guide to 8,500 Battles from Antiquity Through the Twenty-First Century Greenwood Publishing Group, 2007

External links

 Official Website
  1757 The attack of Island of Aix by the Royal Navy during the Seven Years' War

Communes of Charente-Maritime
Aix
Islands of the Bay of Biscay
Charente-Maritime communes articles needing translation from French Wikipedia
Populated coastal places in France